Emoda sagraiana is a species of an operculate land snail, terrestrial gastropod mollusk in the family Helicinidae.

Distribution 
This species lives in Cuba.

Ecology 
Emoda sagraiana is a ground dwelling species.

Predators of Emoda sagraiana include larvae of firefly bug Alecton discoidalis.

References

Helicinidae
Gastropods described in 1842
Endemic fauna of Cuba